Peg Woffington is a 1910 American silent historical film directed by Edwin S. Porter and starring Florence Turner as the eighteenth century Irish actress Peg Woffington. The film is based on the 1852 play Masks and Faces by Tom Taylor and Charles Reade.

See also
 List of American films of 1910

References

Bibliography
 Klossner, Michael. The Europe of 1500-1815 on Film and Television: A Worldwide Filmography of Over 2550 Works, 1895 Through 2000. McFarland & Company, 2002.

External links

1910 films
1910s historical drama films
American silent short films
American historical drama films
1910s English-language films
Films set in London
Films set in the 18th century
Films directed by Edwin S. Porter
American black-and-white films
American films based on plays
1910 short films
1910 drama films
1910s American films
Silent American drama films